The years between 1950 and 1959 featured the 1950s North Indian Ocean cyclone seasons. Each season was an ongoing event in the annual cycle of tropical cyclone formation. The North Indian tropical cyclone season has no bounds, but they tend to form between April and December, peaks in May and November. These dates conventionally delimit the period of each year when most tropical cyclones form in the northern Indian Ocean. Below are the most significant cyclones in the time period. Because much of the North Indian coastline is near sea level and prone to flooding, these cyclones can easily kill many with storm surge and flooding. These cyclones are among the deadliest on earth in terms of numbers killed. In this decade, only one RSMC watched over the basin at the time, India Meteorological Department (IMD) until 1959, when Joint Typhoon Warning Center (JTWC) was formed and it would release unofficial advisories for the basin.

1950 season

April 8–13, 1950 – A deep depression existed over the Bay of Bengal.
May 23–30, 1950 – A deep depression existed over the Bay of Bengal.
June 8–12, 1950 – A cyclonic storm existed over the Bay of Bengal.
June 23–28, 1950 – A depression existed over the Bay of Bengal.
July 10–12, 1950 – A depression existed over the Bay of Bengal.
July 11–15, 1950 – A depression existed over land.
July 25–30, 1950 – A depression existed over the Bay of Bengal.
August 3–7, 1950 – A depression existed over land.
August 9–15, 1950 – A depression existed over the Bay of Bengal.
September 1–5, 1950 – A depression existed over land.
September 9–11, 1950 – A depression existed over the Bay of Bengal.
September 12–19, 1950 – A cyclonic storm existed over the Bay of Bengal.
September 22–24, 1950 – A depression existed over the Bay of Bengal.
October 17–22, 1950 – A depression existed over the Bay of Bengal.
November 16–20, 1950 – A cyclonic storm existed over the Bay of Bengal.
December 2–6, 1950 – A cyclonic storm existed over the Bay of Bengal.

1951 season

April 15–24, 1951 – A cyclonic storm existed over the Arabian Sea.
June 4–7, 1951 – A depression existed over the Bay of Bengal.
June 11–13, 1951 – A depression existed over the Arabian Sea.
June 26 – July 7, 1951 – A depression existed over the Bay of Bengal.
July 19–22, 1951 – A depression existed over the Bay of Bengal.
July 24–29, 1951 – A cyclonic storm existed over the Bay of Bengal.
July 30 – August 1, 1951 – A depression existed over the Bay of Bengal.
August 4–5, 1951 – A depression existed over the Bay of Bengal.
August 16–19, 1951 – A depression existed over the Bay of Bengal.
August 30 – September 1, 1951 – A depression existed over the Bay of Bengal.
September 9–13, 1951 – A depression existed over Land.
October 9–11, 1951 – A depression existed over the Bay of Bengal.
November 12–19, 1951 – A severe cyclonic storm existed over the Arabian Sea.
November 23–26, 1951 – A depression existed over the Bay of Bengal.
December 5–14, 1951 – A severe cyclonic storm existed over the Bay of Bengal.

1952 season

Typhoon Vae crossed over into the Indian Ocean in 1952.

1953 season

1954 season

1955 season

1956 season

June 1956 India cyclone
This cyclone brought torrential rainfall to Midnapore district in West Bengal. About 20,000 people were left homeless, while another 20,000 people were left stranded near the Assam border after the Haora River topped its banks. There was an estimated 480 fatalities, most caused by landslides.

1957 season

December 1957 cyclone
A cyclone developed over the Arabian Sea near the Gulf of Oman on December 27. An offshore oil rig collapsed, killing 20 Royal Dutch Shell employees.

1958 season

A cyclonic storm lasted from October 21–24 and struck Bangladesh (then East Pakistan), causing 12,000 deaths.

1959 season

February 1959 Bahrain cyclone
A tropical cyclone impacted Bahrain and caused 500 deaths.

May 1959 Salalah cyclone
This system first became a low-pressure area near the Laccadive Islands on May 19, tracking northwest towards the Arabian peninsula. The system made landfall at Raysut on May 24. At Salalah, skies clouded over on May 23 as the pressure fell significantly. Winds turned northerly before midnight that night. At 1 a.m. on May 24 the peak of the storm's winds arrived. Many vessels offshore, including two large passenger ships, went to pieces. Five buildings collapsed and several roofs were blown away by the cyclone. Salalah recorded  of rain at their airport. A total of 141 lives from the ship Samha were taken during this tempest.

See also
Atlantic hurricane seasons: 1950, 1951, 1952, 1953, 1954, 1955, 1956, 1957, 1958, 1959
Pacific hurricane seasons: 1950, 1951, 1952, 1953, 1954, 1955, 1956, 1957, 1958, 1959
Pacific typhoon seasons: 1950, 1951, 1952, 1953, 1954, 1955, 1956, 1957, 1958, 1959
1950s South-West Indian Ocean cyclone seasons
1950s Australian region cyclone seasons
1950s South Pacific cyclone seasons

References

North Indian Ocean cyclone seasons
Tropical cyclones in India
Indian Ocean North,1950s
India,1950s